Boys Are Easy (Chinese: 追男仔 ; Pinyin: zhuī nán zǐ) also known as Chasing Boys is a 1993 Hong Kong romantic comedy film directed by Wong Jing, it stars Brigitte Lin, Maggie Cheung, Chingmy Yau, Tony Leung Ka-fai, Jacky Cheung, Ekin Cheng and Jimmy Lin. The film ran in theaters from 12 August 1993 until 1 September 1993. The film is separated into 3 different stories, a male prostitute falling in love with a violent police officer; a kind social worker falling in love with a gangster; a naive virgin falling in love with a doctor.

Plot 
Ching Sing (Richard Ng) is a hardworking father. His wife died when their children were young so he spent most of his life taking care of his children. He has three daughters, Ching Siu Tung (Brigitte Lin), Ching Siu Nam (Maggie Cheung), Ching Siu Sze (Chingmy Yau) and a son, Ching Siu Pei (Jimmy Lin). Ching Sing wants his daughters to get married, so he fakes a terminal illness and forces them to get creative about their romantic relationships, asking to see their boyfriends over dinner. Siu Tung, who is a police officer, meets a male prostitute called Simon Tse Sai (Tony Leung Ka-fai). She offers him money to be her boyfriend for one day to lie to her father. Simon accidentally falls in love with Siu Tung and tries everything to make her fall in love with him. After failing and embarrassing himself multiple times, Siu Tung finally falls in love with Simon. Siu Nam is a social worker. She meets a poor gangster called Wu Ying (Jacky Cheung) and decides to help his family, but instead tries to join the underworld to impress him. Because of this, Wu Ying decides to leave the underworld and start a brand new life with her. Siu Sze, who is a doctor, meets 27-year-old virgin named Lee Chi Ko (Ekin Cheng) through one of her female patients. Having been told that Chi Ko has been set up many time with different girls due to his fear of sex, Siu Sze pranks him by tempting him to have sex, but it fails. Siu Sze realizes that he cares about her a lot and they fall in love with each other. Over dinner having met all of the boyfriends, Ching Sing reveals that his long time pen pal Chi Sum Chan (Sandra Ng) is coming to Hong Kong. Only after a few days, they already start to hate her because of her obvious schemes to steal their father's money. Gangsters break in to their house to try and murder Siu Tung but when they fail, they kidnap and leave with Sum Chan, not realizing that it only makes the family happy.

Cast 
 Brigitte Lin as Ching Siu Tung (程小东) - Ching Sing's daughter, falls in love with Simon, policewoman
 Maggie Cheung as Ching Siu Nam (程小南) - Ching Sing's daughter, falls in love with Wu Ying, social worker
 Chingmy Yau as Ching Siu Sze (程小西) - Ching Sing's daughter, falls in kive Chi Ko, doctor
 Tony Leung Ka-fai as Simon Tse Sai (谢晒) - Falls in love with Siu Tung, male prostitute
 Jacky Cheung as Wu Ying (乌英) - Falls in love with Siu Nam, gangster
 Ekin Cheng as Lee Chi Ko (李志高) - Falls in love with Siu Sze, naive, rich, 27 year old virgin
 Richard Ng as Ching Sing (程胜) - Father of Siu Tung, Siu Nam, Siu Sze and Siu Pei
 Jimmy Lin as Ching Siu Pei (程小北) - Ching Sing's son
 Sandra Ng as Chi Sam (痴心) - Gets kidnapped at the end of the movie
 Ken Lo as Wild Dog - Gangster 
 Helena Law Lan as Mrs Wu - Wu Ying's mother
 Wu Fung as Uncle Sai - Siu Tung, Siu Nam, Siu Sze and Siu Pei's uncle
 Pak Yan as Miss Lee - Chi Ko's mother
 Ronald Wong Ban as Chicken
 Lee Siu-kei as Policeman at police station
 Fei Pak as Policeman
 Wong Yat-fei as Hypnotist
 Lee Ka-Ting as Bastard Ting
 Wong Hung as Manager of gigolo club
 Ray Pang as Wild Dog's thug
 Wu Zhan-Peng as Wild Dog's thug
 Kong Miu-Deng as Wild Dog's thug
 Ching Kwok-Leung as Wild Dog's thug
 Go Shut-Fung as Wild Dog's thug
 Chan Ging-Chi as Wild Dog's thug

Critical response 
On IMDb, it received an average rating of 6.5 out of 10 based on 234 reviews.

On the Chinese movie review website, Douban, it received an average rating of 7.2 out of 10 based on 10435 user reviews.

References

External links 

Boys Are Easy at Hong Kong Cinemagic

Hong Kong romantic comedy films
1990s Cantonese-language films
1993 romantic comedy films
1990s Hong Kong films